The Chinese Taipei national under-23 football team (or Chinese Taipei national Olympic football team) is the national football team that represents Taiwan (Republic of China) in the Olympic Games.

Naming scheme
The Chinese Taipei national Olympic football team enters the Enterprise Football League with a different name every year.
China Steel (2006)
Fubon Financial (2007–2008)

Fixtures

Coaching staff

Current coaching staff

Manager history

 Lee Wai Tong (李惠堂), 1948–1964
 Hsu King Shing (許竟成), 1968
 Chang Teng-yun (張騰雲), 1972
 Lo Pei (羅北), 1976–1988
 Chiang Chia (江  洽), 1984
 Lee Fu-tsai (李富財), 1992
 (趙榮瑞), 1996
 (陳信安), 2000
 Dragan Škorić, 2002
 Peng Wu-sung (彭武松), 2004
 Tsai Shang-ming (蔡尚明), ????–

Players

 Caps and goals are corrected as of 27 October 2021 against .

Competitive record
Olympic GamesFor 1900 to 1988, see Chinese Taipei national football teamAFC U-23 Asian Cup

Asian GamesFor 1951 to 1998, see Chinese Taipei national football team''

East Asian Games
2005: Group match

See also
Chinese Taipei national football team

under-23
Asian national under-23 association football teams